Tie Xi Qu: West of the Tracks (铁西区) is a 2002 Chinese documentary film by Wang Bing. Over nine hours long, the film consists of three parts: "Rust," "Remnants" and "Rails."

Tie Xi Qu was filmed over the course of two years between 1999 and 2001 and details the slow decline of Shenyang's industrial Tiexi district, an area that was once a vibrant example of China's socialist economy. With the rise of the free market and the move towards other industries, however, the factories of Tiexi have all begun to be closed down and with them much of the district's worker-based infrastructure and social constructs.

Although Tie Xi Qu: West of the Tracks is rarely screened due to its length, many critics have named it one of the best and most important films of the 2000s.

Synopsis

"Rust" 
The first portion, "Rust," follows a group of factory workers in three state-run factories: a smelting plant, an electric cable factory and a sheet metal factory. Workers of all three are hindered by sub-standard equipment, hazardous waste, and a lack of safety precautions. Perhaps even worse, the declining need for heavy industry results in a constant shortage of raw materials, leaving the workers idle and concerned for their future. In Chinese, this section is called 工廠 (gōngchǎng), meaning "factory".

"Remnants" 
The second part, "Remnants" follows the families of many of the workers in an old state-run housing block, "Rainbow Row." In particular, Wang focuses on the teenage children who concern themselves with their own lives but must also cope with their inevitable displacement as Tie Xi's factories continue to close down. In Chinese, this section is called 艳粉街 (Yànfěn Jiē), meaning "Yanfen Street."

"Rails" 
The third part, "Rails" narrows its focus to a single father and son who scavenge the rail yards in order to sell raw parts to the factories. With the factories closing however, their future suddenly becomes uncertain. In Chinese, this section is called 铁路 (tiělù), meaning "railway."

Reception 
According to They Shoot Pictures, Don't They?, a website which aggregates critics' reviews, Tie Xi Qu: West of the Tracks is the 32nd most acclaimed film of the 21st century. In a 2012 poll by the British Film Institute, eight critics named it one of the 10 greatest films ever made.

See also 
List of longest films by running time

References

External links 

Jumpcut Discussion
Ramos-Martinez, Manuel (2015), "The Oxidation of Documentary - The Politics of Rust in Wang Bing's Tie Xi Qu:West of the Tracks", at Third Text

Chinese documentary films
2002 films
2000s Mandarin-language films
2002 documentary films
Chinese avant-garde and experimental films
Shenyang
Films directed by Wang Bing
2000s Chinese films